This is a list of species in Apolysis, a genus of bee flies in the family Bombyliidae.

Apolysis species

 Apolysis acrostichalis (Melander, 1946) i c g
 Apolysis albella Zaitzev, 1972 c g
 Apolysis albopilosa (Cole, 1923) c g
 Apolysis analis (Melander, 1946) i c g
 Apolysis andalusiaca (Strobl, 1898) c g
 Apolysis anomala (Hesse, 1975) c g
 Apolysis anthonoma (Melander, 1946) i c g
 Apolysis arcostichalis (Melander, 1946) c g
 Apolysis atra (Cresson, 1915) i c g
 Apolysis beijingensis Yang & Yang g
 Apolysis bicolor (Melander, 1946) i c g
 Apolysis bifaria Melander i c g
 Apolysis bilineata (Melander, 1946) i c g
 Apolysis bivittata (Cresson, 1915) i c g
 Apolysis brachycera Hesse, 1975 c g
 Apolysis brevirostris Hesse, 1938 c g
 Apolysis capax (Coquillett, 1892) i c g
 Apolysis capicola Hesse, 1975 c g
 Apolysis chalybea (Melander, 1946) i c g
 Apolysis cinctura (Coquillett, 1894) i c g
 Apolysis cinerea (Seguy, 1926) c g
 Apolysis cingulata Hesse, 1938 c g
 Apolysis cockerelli (Melander, 1946) i c g
 Apolysis colei (Melander, 1946) i c g
 Apolysis comosa (Melander, 1946) i c g
 Apolysis corollae Greathead, 1966 c g
 Apolysis crisis Evenhuis, 1990 c g
 Apolysis disjuncta Melander, 1946 i c g
 Apolysis dissimilis (Melander, 1946) i c g
 Apolysis distincta (Melander, 1946) i c g
 Apolysis divisa (Melander, 1946) i
 Apolysis dolichorostris Evenhuis & Greathead, 1999 c g
 Apolysis dolorosa (Melander, 1946) i c g
 Apolysis druias Melander, 1946 i c g
 Apolysis elegans (Hesse, 1938) c g
 Apolysis eremitis (Melander, 1946) i c g
 Apolysis eremophila Loew, 1873 c g
 Apolysis fasciola (Coquillett, 1892) i c g
 Apolysis flavifemoris (Hesse, 1975) c g
 Apolysis flavipleurus (Bowden, 1964) c g
 Apolysis forbesi Evenhuis and Hall, 1983 i
 Apolysis formosa (Cresson, 1915) i c g
 Apolysis fumalis Hesse, 1938 c g
 Apolysis fumata (Greathead, 1966) c g
 Apolysis fumipennis (Loew, 1844) c g
 Apolysis glabrifrons Gharali & Evenhuis g
 Apolysis glauca Melander, 1946 i c g
 Apolysis gobiensis (Zaitzev, 1975) c
 Apolysis hesseana Evenhuis, 1990 c g
 Apolysis hirtella Hesse, 1975 c g
 Apolysis humbug (Evenhuis, 1985) i
 Apolysis humilis Loew, 1860 c g
 Apolysis instabilis (Melander, 1946) i c g
 Apolysis irwini Hall, 1976 c g
 Apolysis knabi (Cresson, 1915) i c g
 Apolysis lactearia Hesse, 1975 c g
 Apolysis langemarki (Francois, 1969) c g
 Apolysis langenarki (Francois, 1969) c g
 Apolysis lasia (Melander, 1946) i c g
 Apolysis leberi Evenhuis, 1983 i c g
 Apolysis linderi Hesse, 1962 c g
 Apolysis longirostris (Melander, 1946) i c g
 Apolysis loricata (Melander, 1946) i c g
 Apolysis lugens (Melander, 1946) i c g
 Apolysis maculata (Melander, 1946) i c g
 Apolysis maherniaphila Hesse, 1938 c g
 Apolysis major Zaitzev, 1975 c g
 Apolysis marginalis (Cresson, 1915) i c g
 Apolysis maskali Greathead, 1966 c g
 Apolysis matutina (Melander, 1946) i c g
 Apolysis melanderella Evenhuis, 1990 i c g
 Apolysis minuscula Hesse, 1975 c g
 Apolysis minutissima Melander, 1946 i c g
 Apolysis mitis (Cresson, 1915) i c g
 Apolysis mohavea Melander, 1946 i c g
 Apolysis montana (Melander, 1946) i c g
 Apolysis monticola Hesse, 1975 c g
 Apolysis montivaga Francois, 1969 c g
 Apolysis mus (Bigot, 1886) i c g
 Apolysis namaensis (Hesse, 1938) c
 Apolysis neuter (Melander, 1946) i c g
 Apolysis nigricans (Tabet and Hall, 1987) i c g
 Apolysis obscura (Cresson, 1915) i c g
 Apolysis oreophila Hesse, 1975 c g
 Apolysis ornata (Engel, 1932) c g
 Apolysis palpalis (Melander, 1946) i c g
 Apolysis pannea (Melander, 1946) i c g
 Apolysis parkeri (Melander, 1946) i c g
 Apolysis petiolata Melander, 1946 i c g
 Apolysis polius (Melander, 1946) i c g
 Apolysis puberula (Hesse, 1975) c g
 Apolysis pulchra (Melander, 1946) i c g
 Apolysis pullata (Melander, 1946) i c g
 Apolysis pusilla (Paramonov, 1929) c
 Apolysis pusilloides Gharali & Evenhuis g
 Apolysis pygmaeus (Cole, 1923) i c g
 Apolysis quebradae Hall, 1976 c g
 Apolysis quinquenotata (Johnson, 1903) i c g
 Apolysis retrorsa (Melander, 1946) i c g
 Apolysis scapularis (Melander, 1946) i c g
 Apolysis scapulata (Melander, 1946) i c g
 Apolysis seminitens Hesse, 1975 c g
 Apolysis setosa (Cresson, 1915) i c g
 Apolysis sigma (Coquillett, 1902) i c g b
 Apolysis sipho (Melander, 1946) i c g
 Apolysis speculifera (Melander, 1946) i c g
 Apolysis stuckenbergi Hesse, 1975 c g
 Apolysis superba (Engel, 1933) c g
 Apolysis szappanosi Papp, 2005 c g
 Apolysis thamnophila Hesse, 1975 c g
 Apolysis thornei Hesse, 1938 c g
 Apolysis timberlakei Melander, 1946 i c g
 Apolysis togata (Melander, 1946) i c g
 Apolysis tomentosa (Engel, 1932) c g
 Apolysis trifida (Melander, 1946) i c g
 Apolysis triseritella (Hesse, 1975) c g
 Apolysis trochila (Coquillett, 1894) i c g
 Apolysis trochilides (Williston, 1901) i c g
 Apolysis xanthogaster Hesse, 1938 c g
 Apolysis zaitzevi Evenhuis, 1990 c g
 Apolysis zzyzxensis (Evenhuis, 1985) i c g

Data sources: i = ITIS, c = Catalogue of Life, g = GBIF, b = Bugguide.net

References

Apolysis
Articles created by Qbugbot